KF Adriatiku Mamurras was an Albanian football club based in the city of Mamurras. The club's  home ground was the Mamurras Stadium and they competed in the Albanian Second Division on their last season.

History
The club was founded in the late 1940s under the name Mamurrasi, which was changed to Vëllazerimi in 1991. The club was renamed to Adriatiku Mamurrasi in 2008.

External links
Second Division standings and stats on soccerway.com

Football clubs in Albania
Kurbin
2017 disestablishments in Albania
Association football clubs disestablished in 2017
Kategoria e Dytë clubs